The cyrillization of Japanese is the process of transliterating or transcribing the Japanese language into Cyrillic script in order to represent Japanese proper names or terms in various languages that use Cyrillic, as an aid to Japanese language learning in those languages or as a potential replacement for the current Japanese writing system. This can be done in an ad hoc fashion (e.g. when "sushi" is transliterated as "суши" in Russian Cyrillic or as "суші" in Ukrainian Cyrillic) or using one of a number of systems.

There are a number of cyrillization systems used by different Cyrillic alphabet-based languages, such as:
 The standard and most widely used system for cyrillization into Russian Cyrillic is known as the Polivanov system, named after the Russian and Soviet linguist Yevgeny Polivanov. One of the most arguable questions in this system is a representation of し, ち and じ into "си" (si), "ти" (ti) and "дзи" (dzi) respectively.
 The standard and most widely used (for example, in publications of Taras Shevchenko National University of Kyiv) system for cyrillization into Ukrainian Cyrillic is known as Kovalenko system, named after the Ukrainian linguist . Unlike the Polivanov system, Kovalenko system is very close to the original Japanese pronunciation.
  are also used to transcribe Japanese into Ukrainian.

Sample texts

Universal Declaration of Human Rights, Article 1

References

External links 

 Online Japanese→Polivanov transcription converter
 Proposal for a coordinated Japanese transcription system for several Slavic languages
 Automatic cyrillization of hiragana and katakana

Japanese
Japanese writing system